Johan Kjell Garpenlöv (born 21 March 1968) is a Swedish former ice hockey left winger. He also starred for several years in his native Sweden.  He was drafted in the fifth round, 85th overall, by the Detroit Red Wings in the 1986 NHL Entry Draft.

Born in Stockholm, Garpenlöv played with Nacka HK in the second division early in his career. He next played with Djurgårdens IF club of Elitserien. He played on the Sweden men's national junior ice hockey team, competing at the European Junior Championships in 1985 and 1986, and at the IIHF World U20 Championships in 1987 and 1988, winning the bronze medal at the 1987 tournament. He also competed at the 1990 World Championships, where Sweden won a silver medal.

Garpenlöv next joined the NHL, debuting with the Detroit Red Wings in the 1990–91 season. He scored 40 points as a rookie, including a four-goal game against the St. Louis Blues on 23 November 1990.  After the NHL season, he scored four goals at the 1991 Men's Ice Hockey World Championships, where Sweden won the gold medal.

During the 1991–92 season, Garpenlöv was traded to the San Jose Sharks. Following the season, Garpenlöv was a member of Sweden's World Championship team for the second consecutive year. Garpenlöv scored 22 goals for the Sharks in the 1992–93 season. He played on a line with Sergei Makarov and Igor Larionov in the 1993–94 NHL season.

In March 1995, Garpenlöv was traded to the Florida Panthers for future considerations. He scored a personal best 23 goals in the 1995–96 season, but was injured over much of the next three seasons. In the 1999 NHL Expansion Draft, he was claimed by the Atlanta Thrashers and was a member of the club for its inaugural season in 1999–2000.

Garpenlöv left the NHL prior to the start of the  2000–01 season and returned to Sweden to play for Djurgården. He is currently a general manager of the Sweden men's national ice hockey team since the 2010–2011 season.

From the 2019–2020 season, he replaces Rikard Grönborg as head coach for the Sweden national team. On 28 October 2021, he announced he would leave that position following the 2021–2022 season.

Career statistics

Regular season and playoffs

International

References

External links
 

1968 births
Living people
Adirondack Red Wings players
Atlanta Thrashers players
Dallas Stars scouts
Detroit Red Wings draft picks
Detroit Red Wings players
Djurgårdens IF Hockey players
Florida Panthers players
San Jose Sharks players
Ice hockey people from Stockholm
Swedish expatriate ice hockey players in the United States
Swedish ice hockey left wingers
Nacka HK players
Sweden men's national ice hockey team coaches
Swedish ice hockey coaches
Ice hockey coaches at the 2022 Winter Olympics
Djurgårdens IF Hockey coaches
HockeyAllsvenskan coaches